This list contains the mobile country codes and mobile network codes for networks with country codes between 500 and 599, inclusively – a region that covers Oceania, Maritime South East Asia, and Thailand. Guam and the Northern Mariana Islands as parts of the United States are listed under Mobile Network Codes in ITU region 3xx (North America).

National operators

A

American Samoa (United States of America) – AS

Australia – AU/CC/CX 
includes
Cocos Islands (Australia) – CC
Christmas Island (Australia) – CX

B

Brunei – BN

C

Cook Islands (Pacific Ocean) – CK

E

East Timor – TL

F

Fiji – FJ

French Polynesia (France) – PF

I

Indonesia – ID

K

Kiribati – KI

M

Malaysia – MY

Marshall Islands – MH

Federated States of Micronesia – FM

N

Nauru – NR

New Caledonia (France) – NC

New Zealand – NZ

Niue – NU

Norfolk Island – NF

P

Palau – PW

Papua New Guinea – PG

Philippines – PH

S

Samoa – WS

Singapore – SG

Solomon Islands – SB

T

Thailand – TH

Tokelau – TK

Tonga – TO

Tuvalu – TV

V

Vanuatu – VU

W

Wallis and Futuna – WF

See also
 List of mobile network operators of the Asia Pacific region
 List of LTE networks in Oceania

References

Telecommunications lists
Oceania-related lists